Babille may refer to:

 Babille, Ethiopia, a town in eastern Ethiopia
 Babille, Oromia (woreda), a woreda in the Oromia Region of Ethiopia
 Babille, Somali (woreda), a woreda in the Somali Region of Ethiopia
 E. J. Babille (1883–1970), American assistant film director
 Babille Elephant Sanctuary, also known as the Harar Wildlife Sanctuary, a protected area in Ethiopia